2010 Faroe Islands Premier League, also known as Vodafonedeildin for sponsoring reasons, was the sixty-eighth season of top-tier football on the Faroe Islands. It began on 31 March 2010 with a match between NSÍ Runavík and ÍF Fuglafjørður and ended on 23 October 2010. HB Tórshavn were the defending champions, having won their 20th league championship last season.

Teams
KÍ Klaksvík and 07 Vestur were relegated to 1. deild after finishing 9th and 10th in the 2009 season. They were replaced by 1. deild champions VB/Sumba and runners-up B71 Sandoy.

In other changes, VB/Sumba were renamed FC Suðuroy prior to this season.

Team summaries

League table

Results
The schedule consists of a total of 27 games. Each team plays three games against every opponent in no particular order. At least one of the games will be at home and one will be away. The additional home game for every match-up is randomly assigned prior to the season.

Regular home games

Additional home games

Top goalscorers
Including matches on 23 October; Source: Faroese FA

22 goals
 Arnbjørn Hansen (EB/Streymur)
 Christian Høgni Jacobsen (NSÍ Runavík)

13 goals
 Fróði Benjaminsen (HB Tórshavn)

11 goals
 Øssur Dalbúð (ÍF Fuglafjørður)
 Klæmint Olsen (NSÍ Runavík)

10 goals
 Pól Jóhannus Justinussen (B68 Toftir)
 Jón Krosslá Poulsen (FC Suðuroy)
 Sølvi Vatnhamar (Víkingur)

8 goals
 Rógvi Poulsen (HB Tórshavn)
 Hans Pauli Samuelsen (EB/Streymur)
 Nenad Sarić (ÍF Fuglafjørður)
 Daniel Udsen (EB/Streymur)

See also
 2010 Faroe Islands Cup

References

External links
 Official website 
 Faroe Islands soccer news, results and information

Faroe Islands Premier League seasons
1
Faroe
Faroe